Rajpuri may refer to:
 Rajpuri, Mawal, Pune district, Maharashtra, India
 Rajpuri, Raigad, Maharashtra, India